Stan Hepburn (20 July 1904 – 29 October 1964) was  a former Australian rules footballer who played with St Kilda in the Victorian Football League (VFL).

Notes

External links 
		

1904 births
1964 deaths
Australian rules footballers from Victoria (Australia)
St Kilda Football Club players